Holy Trinity Cathedral, also known in Amharic as Kidist Selassie, is the highest ranking Ethiopian Orthodox Tewahedo cathedral in Addis Ababa, Ethiopia. It was built to commemorate the Ethiopian victory over Italian occupation and is an important place of worship in Ethiopia, alongside other cathedrals such as the Church of Our Lady Mary of Zion in Axum.

Title 
The cathedral bears the title "Menbere Tsebaot", or "Pure Altar". Built in 1942, the church compound was the burial place for those who fought against the Italian occupation, or those who accompanied the Emperor into exile from 1936 to 1941. The Emperor Haile Selassie and his consort the Empress Menen Asfaw are buried in the north transept of the cathedral. Other members of the Imperial Family are buried in the crypt below the church.  The High Altar of the cathedral is dedicated to 'Agaiste Alem Kidist Selassie' (Sovereigns of the World the Holy Trinity).  The other two altars in the Holy of Holies on either side of the High Altar are dedicated to John the Baptist and to 'Kidane Meheret' (Our Lady Covenant of Mercy).  In the south transept of the cathedral is a recently added chapel of Archangel Michael, which houses the Tabot or Ark of St. Michael the Archangel, which was returned to Ethiopia in February 2002 after being discovered in Edinburgh.  This relic was taken by British forces from the mountain citadel of Magdalla in 1868 during their campaign against Emperor Tewodros II.

Architecture 
The cathedral complex also includes the 'Bale Wold' (Feast of God the Son) Church, which is also known as the Church of the Four Heavenly Creatures.  This church served as the original Holy Trinity Monastery Church before the building of the cathedral and dates back to the reign of Emperor Menelik II.  Other facilities include a primary and a secondary school, a monastery and the Holy Trinity Theological College, a museum and monuments housing the remains of those massacred in Addis Ababa by the Italians in 1937 in response to an assassination attempt against Marshal Rodolfo Graziani, Viceroy of Italian East Africa.  In addition is the monument and tomb of the officials of the imperial government who were executed by the Communist Derg regime. Holy Trinity Cathedral is the official seat of the Orthodox Archdiocese of Addis Ababa.  The Patriarchs of the Ethiopian Orthodox Tewahedo Church are enthroned at Holy Trinity Cathedral and all Bishops are consecrated there as well.

Imperial tombs and burials 

The tombs of the Emperor Haile Selassie and Empress Menen Asfaw, as well as other members of the Imperial Family, are inside Holy Trinity Cathedral. Patriarchs, Abuna Takla Haymanot and Abune Paulos of the Ethiopian Orthodox Tewahedo Church, are buried in the churchyard, as is the famous British suffragette and anti-fascist activist Sylvia Pankhurst. Prime Minister Meles Zenawi and other prominent Ethiopians are also buried there.

Gallery

References

External links

Holy Trinity Cathedral at www.sacred-destinations.com

Cathedrals in Addis Ababa
Ethiopian Orthodox Tewahedo cathedrals